Sulfurovum is a genus within the Campylobacterota which was first described in 2004 with the isolation and description of the type species Sulfurovum lithotrophicum from Okinawa trough hydrothermal sediments. Named for their ability to oxidize sulfur and their egg-like shape, cells are gram-negative, coccoid to short rods. Mesophilic chemolithoautotrophic growth occurs by oxidation of sulfur compounds coupled to the reduction of nitrate or molecular oxygen.

References 

Bacteria genera
Campylobacterota